Tears on Your Face (Italian: Una lacrima sul viso) is a 1964 Italian "musicarello" film directed by Ettore Maria Fizzarotti. It is named after the Bobby Solo's hit song "Una lacrima sul viso".

Cast 

 Bobby Solo: Bobby Tonner 
 Laura Efrikian: Lucia 
 Nino Taranto: Professor Giovanni Todini 
 Lucy D'Albert: Luisa Todini 
 Dolores Palumbo: Teresa 
 Lena von Martens: Gabriella 
 Dante Maggio: Traffic policeman
 Agostino Salvietti: Vincenzo 
 Carlo Taranto: Guitarist

References

External links

1964 films
Musicarelli
1964 musical comedy films
Films directed by Ettore Maria Fizzarotti
Films with screenplays by Giovanni Grimaldi
Films with screenplays by Bruno Corbucci
1960s Italian-language films
1960s Italian films